Project Runway Season 14 is the fourteenth season of the television show Project Runway, appearing on Lifetime. The season began on August 6, 2015. There were 16 designers competing to become "the next great American designer." 
Supermodel Heidi Klum, Marie Claire creative director Nina Garcia, and fashion designer Zac Posen all returned as judges this season. Tim Gunn maintained his role as the workroom mentor.

In a post-season interview Tim Gunn expressed his disappointment with the designers of this season citing a deficiency of energy in them for the title. He stated that he 'hated' the entire season labeling the progress of the contestants as 'lackluster'.

In 2018, Kelly Dempsey, Candice Cuoco, Merline Labissiere and Edmond Newton competed in the Project Runway All Stars (season 6), with Kelly placing 15th, Candice placing 12th, Merline placing 8th and Edmond placing 5th of 16.

Designers 
Sources:

: Saisha was known as Swapnil on season 14, prior to transitioning.

Designer Progress 

: In episode 5, although the judges categorized all the clothes into ones they liked and didn't like, their deliberation revealed the ones they liked the most (Edmond, Jake, and Saisha). Similarly, the ones they liked the least were revealed when Amanda, Candice, and Kelly were left as the three in danger of going home, while Ashley, Laurie, and Lindsey were called safe.
: In episode 13, Tim Gunn decided to retroactively use his "Tim Gunn Save" on Edmond, canceling out his elimination in episode 12.
: Saisha was known as Swapnil during her run on season 14 before transitioning.

 The designer won Project Runway Season 14.
 The designer advanced to Fashion Week.
 The designer won the challenge.
 The designer came in second but did not win the challenge.
 The designer had one of the highest scores for that challenge, but did not win.
 The designer had one of the lowest scores for that challenge, but was not eliminated.
 The designer was in the bottom two, but was not eliminated.
 The designer lost and was eliminated from the competition.
 The designer lost, but was brought back to the competition by Tim Gunn.
 The designer withdrew from the competition.

Model Progress 

: In episode 10, the designers had other clients as their models.

 The model was paired with the winning designer of Project Runway Season 16.
 The model wore the design that advanced the designer to fashion week.
  The model wore the winning design.  
 The model wore the design with the second-highest score.  
  The model wore the design with one of the highest scores but did not win.  
  The model wore the design with one of the lowest scores. 
 The model wore the design that landed in the bottom 2.  
  The model wore the losing design.  
 The model was eliminated.

Model Assignments 

Designer Legend
Amanda Perna: AP
Ashley Nell Tipton: AT
Blake Patterson: BP
Candice Cuoco: CC
David Giampiccolo: DG
Duncan Chambers Watson: DW
Edmond Newton: EN
Gabrielle Arruda: GA
Hanmiao Yang: HY
Jake Wall: JW
Joseph Charles Poli: JP
Kelly Dempsey: KD
Laurie Underwood: LU
Lindsey Creel: LC
Merline Labissiere: ML
Saisha Shinde: SS

Episodes

Episode 0: Road to the Runway 
Original airdate: July 30, 2015

Episode 1: Mad Dash Mayhem 
Original airdate: August 6, 2015

 The sixteen designers of Project Runway Season 14 went to Madison Square Garden for their first challenge. They had to create a look that expressed themselves as designers using fabrics found around the arena. Before the designers began to work, Tim Gunn announced to the designers that David, Saisha, and Merline didn't bring their own personal tool kits while everyone else did.
 Guest Judge: Hannah Davis
 WINNER: Ashley
 ELIMINATED: Duncan

Episode 2: It's All in the Cards 
Original airdate: August 13, 2015

 The fifteen designers go to Hallmark where they have two minutes to choose as many Hallmark Signature cards as possible to create a look. They had to use the cards as their materials and their inspiration. David and Ashley (who had immunity) were both told by the judges that they didn't follow the rules because there was exposed muslin.
 Guest Judge: Ashley Tisdale
 WINNER: Edmond
 ELIMINATED: David

Episode 3: Shut Up and Sew 
Original airdate: August 20, 2015

 Global travel destinations and exotic locations inspire the designers (in teams of two) to create looks tailored for a day-to-night transition.

 Guest Judge: Tracee Ellis Ross
 WINNERS: Ashley and Candice
 ELIMINATED: Hanmiao

Episode 4: Fashion Flip 
Original airdate: August 27, 2015

 The designers visit Mood and put a modern twist on a classic design.
 Guest Judge: Kiernan Shipka
 WINNER: Blake
 ELIMINATED: Gabrielle

Episode 5: Gunn and Heid 
Original airdate: September 3, 2015

 Tensions arise when the designers are split into two teams to battle for their fabrics in a paintball competition; the teams receive a surprise. 
 Guest Judge: Kelly Osbourne & Lisa Perry
 WINNER: Edmond
 ELIMINATED: Amanda

Episode 6: Lace to the Finish 
Original airdate: September 10, 2015

 The designers are tasked to create lingerie for host Heidi Klum's fashion line. They also get a rude awakening on the runway.  
 Guest Judge: Bella Thorne
 WINNER: Merline
 ELIMINATED: Blake

Episode 7: Haute Tech Couture 
Original airdate: September 17, 2015

 Fashion and technology collide when the designers seek recycled electronics in dumpsters in the season's second unconventional-materials challenge. 
 Guest Judge: Paula Patton & Anne Fulenwider
 WINNER: Kelly
 ELIMINATED: Joseph
 WITHDREW: Jake
Jake withdrew from the competition after receiving news that his dog had to be euthanized.

Episode 8: Broadway or Bust 
Original airdate: September 24, 2015

 The magic of Broadway inspires the designers, who create stylish looks based on the musical "Finding Neverland".
 Guest Judge: Coco Rocha
 WINNER: Candice
 ELIMINATED: Lindsey

Episode 9: Make It Sell 
Original airdate: October 1, 2015

 The designers must create ready-to-wear looks to be reproduced and sold online; a disagreement between the judges leads to the most contentious runway yet.
 Guest Judge: Ciara & Yuchin Mao
 WINNER: Edmond
 ELIMINATED: Laurie

Episode 10: Crew's All In 
Original airdate: October 8, 2015

 The designers must makeover real women from the ``Project Runway`` crew. Tim reaches his breaking point with one designer.
 Guest Judge: Shiri Appleby & Constance Zimmer
 WINNER: Kelly
 ELIMINATED: Saisha

Episode 11: The Runway's in 3D! 
Original airdate: October 15, 2015

 In a fashion-forward challenge, the designers use 3D-printing technology to create avant-garde styles.
 Guest Judge: Mel B.
 WINNER: Kelly
 ELIMINATED: Merline

Episode 12: Roll Out the Red Carpet 
Original airdate: October 22, 2015

 The designers land in Los Angeles to create red-carpet looks in the final challenge before Fashion Week.
 Guest Judge: Christian Siriano
 WINNER: Kelly
 ELIMINATED: Edmond

Episode 13: Finale, Part 1 
Original airdate: October 29, 2015

 In Part 1 of the two-part Season 14 finale, the designers journey home to create their collections and gear up for a visit from mentor Tim Gunn. They then return to New York, complete with a twist.
 TIM GUNN SAVE: Edmond.

Episode 14: Finale, Part 2 
Original airdate: November 5, 2015

 Conclusion. The winning designer is crowned in the Season 14 finale. Before that, the designers scramble to retool their collections following a brutal critique with the judges. Appearing: Carrie Underwood.
 WINNER of Project Runway:  Ashley
 ELIMINATED: Kelly (2nd place), Edmond (3rd place), Candice (4th place)

Episode 15: Season 14 Reunion 
Original airdate: November 12, 2015

 The designers reunite to sew up Season 14 as they reflect on the highs, lows and memorable moments from their time on the show. Host: Tim Gunn.
 This season included a special prize for the designer who had won the most challenges throughout the competition. A reward of 25,000 was therefore awarded by Mary Kay to Kelly Dempsey for winning 4 challenges.

References

External links 
 Project Runway Season 14 Official Website 
 
 JustFab's website

Season 14
2015 American television seasons
2015 in fashion